University of Maryland Observatory  is an astronomical observatory owned and operated by the University of Maryland, College Park.  It is located in College Park, Maryland, USA. The Observatory hosts free open houses for the public twice a month, where visitors receive a lecture and access to three of the Observatory's telescopes. The open houses begin at 9 PM from May to October, and at 8 PM from November to April. The Washington Post named the Observatory open houses one of its seven favorite weekend excursions to do in the Washington metropolitan area in 2009.

See also
 List of observatories

References

University of Maryland, College Park
Astronomical observatories in Maryland
University of Maryland, College Park facilities
Tourist attractions in Prince George's County, Maryland